This is a list of shopping malls in Mexico, arranged by state.

Shopping centers in Mexico are classified into six different types:
Super-regional shopping center with 90,000+ sqm GLA. These typically have 3 or more full-line department store anchors (e.g. Liverpool, El Palacio de Hierro, Sears) and feature merchandise in the luxury, premium and AAA categories.
Power centers with 19,000–25,000 sqm of gross leasable area (GLA). Typically the largest anchors are Chedraui and Soriana supermarkets/hypermarkets; Walmart; and/or Sam's Club or Costco membership clubs.
Fashion mall with 18,000–45,000 sqm GLA. There are typically focused on clothing and accessories, with no larger anchors other than a multicinema.
Community shopping center with 9,000–45,000 sqm GLA. The largest anchors are typically supermarkets (e.g. Chedraui, la Cómer, Ley, Soriana, Sumesa, Superama), junior department stores (e.g. Suburbia, Sanborns, Coppel), and La Parisina; and multicinemas.
Strip centers with less than 7,500 sqm GLA, typically in L- or U-shape and with parking in front of the stores.
Mixed shopping centers with 3,000–30,000 sqm GLA exhibiting elements of the other formats.

Aguascalientes 
Aguascalientes
 Centro Comercial El Parián
 Altaria
 Galerías
 Velaria Mall
 El Dorado
 Espacio Aguascalientes

Baja California 
Ensenada
 Centro Comercial Misión 
 Hussong's Plaza
 MacroPlaza Del Mar 
 Plaza Bahia
 Plaza Caracol
 Plaza Marina
 Plaza Santa Lucía
 Plaza Transpeninsular

Mexicali
 Plaza Carranza
 Plaza Fiesta
 Plaza Fimbres
 Plaza Galerías del Valle
 Plaza La Cachanilla 
 Plaza Lienzo
 Plaza Nuevo Mexicali
 Plaza San Pedro

Rosarito
 Pabellón Rosarito

Tecate
 Plaza Los Encinos

Tijuana
 Centro Comercial Minarete
 Centro Comercial Otay 
 MacroPlaza Insurgentes
 Plaza Agua Caliente
 Plaza Americana Otay 
 Plaza Carrousel 
 Plaza Loma Bonita
 Plaza Monarca 
 Plaza Papalote 
 Plaza Pavilion 
 Plaza Río Tijuana
 Plaza Sendero Tijuana
 Plaza Viva Tijuana

Baja California Sur 
Los Cabos
 Plaza Bonita Mall
 Puerto Paraiso

Campeche
Campeche
 Antiques Imperio Arte Fino 
 BIG HOME  
 CITY CLUB 
 City Fashion Mall  
 City Mall 
 Concentro  
 Luxury Mall
 Mulbar 
 Office Altabrisa
 Office Depot
 Office Max
 Offix 
 Plaza Altamar
 Plaza Bodega Aurrera
 Plaza Campeche Luxury Fashion Mall
 Plaza Cenderos
 Plaza del Mar
 Plaza Handares
 Plaza Home Depot 
 Plaza Liverpool 
 Plaza Palacio de Hierro 
 Plaza Sears - Campeche Centro
 Plaza Sears 
 Plaza Paseo
 Plaza Soriana 
 Plaza Suburbia  
 Plaza Universidad
 Sam's Club

Cd. del Carmen
 Air Plaza
 Centro Comercial - Cd. del Carmen Galaxy
 Centro Comercial Chicago Carmen
 Centro Comercial Marshall
 Chedragui
 City Center 
 City Mall Carmen 
 CondoPlaza 
 Gran Plaza
 Luxury Mall  
 Mega Plaza 
 Paseo del Carmen
 Plaza Arboledas
 Plaza Bodega Aurrera
 Plaza Bodega Aurrera - Cd. del Carmen Norte
 Plaza Bodega Aurrera - Cd. del Carmen Oriente
 Plaza Bodega Aurrera - Cd. del Carmen Perinorte
 Plaza Bodega Aurrera - Cd. del Carmen Perisur
 Plaza Bodega Aurrera - Cd. del Carmen Poniente
 Plaza Bodega Aurrera - Cd. del Carmen Sur
 Plaza Camichines
 Plaza Comercial Mexicana - Cd. del Carmen Centro I
 Plaza Comercial Mexicana - Cd. del Carmen Centro II
 Plaza Comercial Mexicana - Cd. del Carmen Centro III
 Plaza Comercial Mexicana - Cd. del Carmen Centro IV
 Plaza Comercial Mexicana - Cd. del Carmen Oriente
 Plaza Comercial Mexicana - Cd. del Carmen Poniente
 Plaza Comercial Mexicana - Cd. del Carmen Sur
 Plaza de la Luna
 Plaza de la Tecnología Carmen 
 Plaza de las Americas
 Plaza del Angel 
 Plaza Deli Luxury 
 Plaza Delta 
 Plaza Dorada
 Plaza Du Soleil 
 Plaza Fernando 
 Plaza Fernando Del Mar
 Plaza Fiesta
 Plaza Galerías
 Plaza Gualmar 
 Plaza Heven
 Plaza Krystal Carmen
 Plaza Liverpool
 Plaza Luxury Mall
 Plaza Mercado Soriana - Cd. del Carmen Centro I
 Plaza Mercado Soriana - Cd. del Carmen Centro II
 Plaza Mercado Soriana - Cd. del Carmen Centro III
 Plaza Mercado Soriana - Cd. del Carmen Centro IV
 Plaza Mercado Soriana - Cd. del Carmen Oriente
 Plaza Mercado Soriana - Cd. del Carmen Poniente
 Plaza Mercado Soriana - Cd. del Carmen Sur
 Plaza Norte Carmen
 Plaza Onssa 
 Plaza Palacio de Hierro
 Plaza Palmira
 Plaza Patria
 Plaza Pelicanos
 Plaza Presidentes
 Plaza Real 
 Plaza Real de 14 Fashion Mall - Cd. del Carmen Bicenario
 Plaza San Isidro 
 Plaza San Marcos
 Plaza Santa Fe Carmen
 Plaza Sears
 Plaza Sears - Cd. del Carmen II
 Plaza Sears - Cd. del Carmen III
 Plaza Soft Mall 
 Plaza Soriana
 Plaza Suix 
 Plaza Zentralia 
 Plaza Universidad 
 Plaza Vestir 
 Punto Sao Paolo

Chiapas 
Comitán
 Plaza Las Flores

Ocosingo
 Plaza Toniná  (under construction)

Reforma
 Plaza Reforma

San Cristóbal de Las Casas
 Plaza San Cristóbal

Tapachula
 Plaza Crystal 
 Plaza Galerías Tapachula 
 Plaza Patio 
 Plaza Soriana

Tonalá
 Plaza Las Flores Tonalá

Tuxtla Gutiérrez
 Ámbar Fashion Mall - lifestyle center  (2017)
 Plaza Arboria Park -  town center  
 Plaza Ambar -  strip mall 
 Plaza Baktún -  town center
 Plaza Cedros -  strip mall 
 Plaza Crystal -   community center 
 Plaza Galerías Boulevard -   fashion mall
 Plaza Jardines -  town center 
 Plaza Las Américas/Del Sol -  community center 
 Plaza Mirador -  town center
 Plaza Poliforum -   community center 
 Plaza Regia -   town center
 Plaza Santa Elena - town center (remodeling)

Villaflores

Coahuila 
Ramos Arizpe
 Plaza Bella

Saltillo
 Galerias Saltillo
 Mi Plaza Mirasierra 
 Plaza Nogalera 
 Plaza Real Saltillo 
 Plaza Sendero

Torreón
 Galerías Laguna  
 Intermall 
 Plaza Cuatro Caminos

Colima
Colima
 Zentralía Colima  (Fashion Mall)
 Plaza San Fernando (Fashion Mall)
 Plaza Country (Town Center)
 Laguna Shop (Town Center)
 Plaza San Carlos (Strip Center)
 Plaza Coliman (Power Center)

Villa de Álvarez
 Plaza Sendera (Lifestyle Center) Apertura el 9 de septiembre de 2021 
 Plaza Colima (Power Center)
 Plaza Universidad (Strip Center)
 Plaza Rancagua (Strip Center)
 Patio Villa de Álvarez (Power Center)

Manzanillo
 Punto Bahia (Fashion Mall)
 Plaza Manzanillo (Community Center)
 Brizza Manzanillo Galería Comercial (Strip Center)
 Plaza Salagua (Power Center)
 Patio Manzanillo I (Power Center)
 Patio Manzanillo II (Power Center)

Tecomán
 Alameda Comercial Tecomán (Community Center)
 Plaza Caxitlán (Strip Center)
 Paseo Tecomán (Strip Center)

Durango
Durango
 Paseo Durango

Guanajuato 
Celaya
 Galerías Tecnologico 
 Parque Celaya 
 Plaza Las Américas

Irapuato
 Plaza Fiesta
 Plaza Cibeles 
 Plaza Jacarandas

León
 Centro Comercial Plaza Piel 
 Centro Max 
 Galerias Las Torres 
 Plaza del Zapato  
 Plaza Galerias
 Plaza Las Palmas 
 Plaza Mayor (remodeling)
 Plaza Venecia

San Miguel de Allende
 Plaza la Luciérnaga

Guerrero 

Acapulco
 Galerías Diana 
 La Isla Shopping Village 
 Plaza Costera 
 Plaza Dorada

Chilpancingo
 Galerias Chilpancingo

Hidalgo 
Pachuca
 Patio Pachuca 
 Plaza Bella 
 Plaza Galerias Pachuca
 Plaza Q  
 Plaza Universidad
 Plaza Explanada Pachuca
 Parque Vértice Pachuca
 Plaza Revo
 Plaza Del Valle
 Vía Dorada 
 Alta Plata

Jalisco 
Área Metropolitana de Guadalajara

Guadalajara
 Centro Magno (Town Center)
 Galería del Calzado (Community Center)
 Gran Terraza Oblatos (Fashion Mall) (anchors Liverpool, Cinépolis, Inditex, Soriana Híper and Office Depot)
 Midtown Jalisco (Town Center)
 Mulbar (Town Center)
 Plaza Alameda (Town Center)
 Plaza Bonita (Community Center)
 Plaza de la Computación (Town Center)
 Plaza Estadio (Power Center)
 Plaza Independencia (Community Center) (anchors Bodega Aurrerá, Cinépolis, Surtidora Departmental and Coppel)
 Plaza México (Community Center)
 Plaza Soriana Río Nilo (Power Center)
 Punto Sao Paulo (Town Center)
 Sania (Strip Mall)

Tlajomulco de Zuñiga
 Centrocity Santa Fe (Strip Mall)
 Galerías Santa Anita (Fashion Mall) (anchors Liverpool, Cinépolis, Suburbia, C&A and H&M)
 La Gourmetería (LifeStyle Center)
 Las Plazas Outlet Guadalajara (Fashion Mall)
 Multiplaza del Valle (Community Center)
 Plaza Chedraui Tlajomulco (Power Center)
 Plaza El Manantial (Strip Mall)
 Plaza El Palomar (Community Center)
 Plaza San Miguel (Strip Mall)
 Plaza Soriana Nueva Galicia (Power Center)
 Plaza Soriana San Agustín (Power Center)
 Plaza Soriana Santa Fe (Power Center)
 Plaza Vallarta (Strip Mall)
 Provenza Center (Strip Mall)
 Punto Sur (LifeStyle Center) (Inditex, Parisina, Cinépolis and Cuidado con el Perro)
 Urban Center Guadalajara (Strip Mall)

Tlaquepaque
 Centro Comercial Tlaquepaque (Power Center)
 Centro Sur (Fashion Mall)
 Espacio Tlaquepaque (Strip Mall)
 Forum Tlaquepaque (Fashion Mall) (anchors Liverpool, Cinépolis, Suburbia, C&A, Inditex, Office Max and Soriana Híper)
 Plaza Camichines (Community Center)
 Plaza de la Tecnología Centro Sur (Strip Mall)
 Plaza Las Fuentes (Community Center)
 Plaza Río Nilo Tlaquepaque (Community Center)

Tonalá
 Altea Río Nilo (Community Center)
 Plaza Lomas (Community Center) (anchors Chedraui, Cinemex, Suburbia and Famsa)
 Plaza Viva (Strip Mall)

Zapopan
 Andares (LifeStyle Center) (anchors El Palacio de Hierro, Liverpool, Inditex, Cinépolis VIP and H&M)
 Ciudadela (LifeStyle Center)
 Concentro (Town Center)
 CondoPlaza (Town Center)
 Distrito La Perla (Fashion Mall) (anchors Liverpool, Cinépolis, Inditex and H&M)
 Espacio Galerías (Community Center)
 Galerías Guadalajara (Fashion Mall) (anchors Liverpool, Sears, C&A, Sanborns, H&M, Inditex Cinépolis, Suburbia, Walmart and Sam's Club)
 Gran Terraza Belenes (Fashion Mall)
 La Gran Plaza Fashion Mall (Fashion Mall) (anchors Liverpool, Sears, C&A, Sanborns, Inditex and Cinépolis)
 The Landmark (Fashion Mall)
 Plaza Arboledas (Community Center)
 Plaza Aviación (Power Center)
 Plaza Bugambilias (Community Center)
 Plaza Cordilleras  (Power Center)
 Plaza de la Luna (Strip Mall)
 Plaza del Angel (Community Center)
 Plaza del Sol (LifeStyle Center) (anchors Suburbia, Sanborns, Inditex, Soriana Híper and C&A)
 Plaza Milenium (Community Center)
 Plaza Pabellón (Fashion Mall)
 Plaza Patria (Fashion Mall)
 Plaza Presidentes (Strip Mall)
 Plaza San Isidro (Community Center)
 Plaza Sanzio (Strip Mall)
 Plaza VD Tesistán (Strip Mall)

Ameca
 Plaza Tulipanes Ameca
 Soriana Express Ameca

Arandas
 Plaza Tulipanes
 Poliplaza

Atotonilco El Alto
 Plaza Comercial Del Valle

Autlán de Navarro
 Galerías Metropolitana Autlán (Cinépolis 5 cinemas and Soriana Express)
 Plaza Cantabria Autlán 
 Plaza Catedral
 Plaza del Valle
 Plaza Imperial
 Plaza Vista del Sol

Chapala
 Ajijic Center
 Centro Laguna
 Plaza Las Flores
 Plaza Interlago
 Plaza Soriana Chapala 
 Walmart Ajijic Chapala

Ciudad Guzmán
 Mi Centro Ciudad Guzmán (Power Center) (Cinépolis, Coppel, Elektra, CONVERSE, First Cash and others)
 Paseo La Feria (Lifestyle Strip Mall) (Cinemex, Cuarto de Kilo, Café La Flor de Córdoba, Helados Dolphy, Yogus, AirePAZ Chocolatería, Cocos Locos and others)
 Plaza Soriana Cd. Guzmán (Power Center) (Cinemex, Soriana Mercado, Coppel and LONG HANG)
 Plaza Zapotlán (Community Center) (Soriana Mercado [initially Gigante], Farmacias Guadalajara and La Marina, among others)
 Plaza CompuCenter Cd. Guzmán (Technology plaza)

El Grullo
 Plaza Las Grullas
 Plaza Santa Fe

Lagos de Moreno
 Plaza Capuchinas
 Plaza Soriana Lagos de Moreno
 Portal Lagos de Moreno

Ocotlán
 Plaza Los Pirules
 Plaza San Felipe
 Plaza Soriana Ocotlán

Puerto Vallarta
 Galerías Vallarta
 La Isla Shopping Village
 Macro Plaza Vallarta
 Plaza Caracol 
 Plaza Neptuno 
 Plaza Marina 
 Plaza Península
 Plaza Soriana Pitillal

San Juan de los Lagos
 Argania Centro Comercial
 Bodega Aurrerá San Juan de los Lagos
 Plaza Juárez
 Plaza San Juan

Sayula
 Plaza Sayula (Cinépolis 5 cinemas and Vancouver Wings)
 Mi Bodega Aurrerá Sayula (Mi Bodega Aurrerá)
 Soriana Express Sayula (Soriana Express)
 Centro Regional de Comercio Sayula

Tala
 Plaza Gardenia
 Soriana Express Tala (Soriana Express)

Tepatitlán de Morelos
 Centro Comercial Capilla de Guadalupe (Community Center) (Capilla de Guadalupe)
 Punto La Gloria (Strip Mall) (Tepatitlán de Morelos)
 Plaza Carnicerito (Strip Mall) (Tepatitlán de Morelos)
 Plaza Galerías Tepatitlán (Community Center) (Tepatitlán de Morelos)
 Plaza Los Altos (Community Center) (Tepatitlán de Morelos)
 Plaza Soriana Tepatitlán (Power Center) (Tepatitlán de Morelos)
 Plaza Villalta (Strip Mall) (Tepatitlán de Morelos)
 Plaza Punto Vizcaya (Strip Mall Express) (Tepatitlán de Morelos)
 Plaza San Jorge (Strip Mall Express) (Tepatitlán de Morelos)

Tequila
 Coppel Tequila Jalisco (Power Center) (Coppel and Farmacias Guadalajara)
 Mi Bodega Aurrerá Tequila Jalisco (Power Center) (Mi Bodega Aurrerá)
 Plaza Ubika Tequila (Power Center) (Farmacias Benavides, Pizza Hut, First Cash and Sukarne)

Villa Hidalgo
 Centro Comercial Ámbar
 Centro Comercial GUSOGA Center (Chedraui, Cinépolis, residential areas, Hotel, Casino, and more)
 Centro Comercial Villa Textil
 Las Palmas Centro Comercial 
 Mi Bodega Aurrerá Villa Hidalgo (Mi Bodega Aurrerá)
 Plaza JP
 Villa del Sol

Zacoalco de Torres
 Mi Bodega Aurrerá Zacoalco de Torres (Mi Bodega Aurrerá)

Mexico City
See also State of Mexico

Las Águilas area, Álvaro Obregón borough
Portal Centenario (anchors include Walmart, Suburbia, Starbucks, Office Depot, Coppel, Cinépolis)

Azcapotzalco
Parque Vía Vallejo,  gross leasable area (anchors include Sears, Soriana, Sanborns, Suburbia)

Benito Juárez borough
Galerías Insurgentes and adjacent freestanding Liverpool, Colonia del Valle
Manacar, colonia Insurgentes Mixcoac,  of gross leasable commercial space
 Centro Coyoacán (colonia Xoco, anchors include El Palacio de Hierro which will close in 2022 and move to Mítikah)
 Mítikah (colonia Xoco, opening late 2022, anchors will include El Palacio de Hierro and Liverpool);  of commercial space in a  mixed-use complex
 Metrópoli Patriotismo, colonia San Pedro de los Pinos, opened 2006,  of gross leasable area, anchors include Cinemex
Plaza Universidad, colonia Santa Cruz Atoyac, opened 1969, the city's first mall, anchors include Sears,  of gross leasable area
World Trade Center Mexico City, colonia Nápoles (anchors include Sears, Cinemex)

Bosques de las Lomas
 Paseo Arcos Bosques

Colonia Buenavista
Forum Buenavista (anchors include Sears, Fábricas de Francia, Coppel),  gross leasable commercial area

Coapa, Tlalpan borough
 Galerías Coapa (anchors include Liverpool and Sears)
 Paseo Acoxpa (anchors include Best Buy, Boutique Palacio and Casa Palacio)

Condesa
Espacio Condesa (mixed-use, anchors include Cinépolis and Petco), 23,527 sqm gross leasable area

Cuajimalpa (not incl. Santa Fe, see below)
Plaza Cuajimalpa (anchors include Suburbia, Walmart)
Plaza Vista Hermosa (Office Depot, Petco, Waldo's)
Shops Cuajimalpa (a.k.a. Plaza Real, anchors include Coppel)

Historic Center of Mexico City
Barrio Alameda
Liverpool historic flagship
El Palacio de Hierro historic flagship
Parque Alameda
Sears freestanding store, Avenida Juárez

Iztapalapa
Plaza Central (anchors include Coppel, Elektra)
Plaza Las Antenas (anchors include Liverpool, Sanborns, Sears, Cinépolis)
Plaza Oriente (anchors include Suburbia, Walmart)
Plaza Tezontle (anchors include Sears)

Jardines del Pedregal
 Artz Pedregal, mixed-use,  of commercial space, total of  incl. offices and park, anchors include Cinemex. Luxury boutiques.
 Perisur (anchors include Liverpool, El Palacio de Hierro, Sears),  gross leasable area

Lindavista
Parque Lindavista (anchors include Cinemex, Sanborns)
Plaza Lindavista (anchors include Sears)
Plaza Torres Lindavista (anchors include Suburbia and Walmart)

Las Lomas (col. Lomas de Chapultepec)
Carso Palmas
Lomas Plaza

Narvarte (col. Piedad Narvarte)
Parque Delta (anchors include Liverpool),  gross leasable area

Polanco and Nuevo Polanco (col. Granada, col. Irrigación)
 Antara Polanco (anchors include Casa Palacio)
 Centro Comercial Polanco, Avenida Miguel de Cervantes (anchors include Costco)
 Galerías Polanco, Avenida Horacio (anchors include West Elm)
 Liverpool Mariano Escobedo
 Miyana
 Pabellón Polanco (anchors include Sears)
 El Palacio de Hierro flagship "El Palacio de los Palacios"
 Parques Polanco (mixed-use complex)
 Pasaje Polanco, historic shopping arcade
 Plaza Carso (includes Teatro Telcel, City Market, former Saks Fifth Avenue location)

Colonia Roma
Pabellón Cuauhtémoc
El Palacio de Hierro freestanding store
El Parián (historic shopping arcade)
Plaza Insurgentes (anchors include Sears, Cinemex)

San Ángel
 Altavista 147
 Portal San Ángel (anchors include Sears, Sam's Club, Walmart, Cinépolis)

Santa Fe incl. Zedec Santa Fe
 Centro Santa Fe, anchors include El Palacio de Hierro, Liverpool, Sears, Casa Palacio,  gross leasable area
 City Walk
 Garden Santa Fe(es) underground mall
 Patio Santa Fe (anchors include Walmart, Sam's Club, The Home Depot, Office Depot, Petco, Sportium gym, Cinépolis)
 Samara Shops (anchors include Cinépolis)

Tepeyac
Plaza Tepeyac, opening 2022, 35,000 sqm of commercial space

Venustiano Carranza borough
Encuentro Oceanía (anchors include IKEA),  gross leasable area
 Plaza Aeropuerto
 VIA 515, Iztacalco

Colonia Verónica Anzures
Plaza de las Estrellas

Zona Rosa, Colonia Juárez
 Plaza Jacaranda (defunct, historically significant)
 Plaza la Rosa
 Reforma 222 (anchors include Cinemex, Sanborns)

State of Mexico 

Atizapán de Zaragoza
 Bosque Esmeralda
 Espacio Esmeralda
 Galerias Atizapán (anchors include Liverpool and Sears)
 Luna Parc

Chimalhuacan
 Plaza Chimalhuacan (anchors include Sears)

Coacalco de Berriozabal
 Coacalco Power Center
 Cosmopol (anchors include Liverpool, Sears)
 Plaza Coacalco
 Plaza Las Flores (anchors include Home Depot, Sams Club, Soriana, Suburbia, Walmart)
 Plaza Zentralia Coacalco (anchors include Sears)

Cuautitlán Izcalli
 Centro San Miguel
 Luna Parc Cuautitlán Izcalli (anchors include Sears, Sanborns, Cinépolis, Star Médica hospital)
 Multiplaza Izacalli
 Perinorte
 Plaza San Marcos and San Marcos Power Center
 Punta Norte

Ecatepec
 Centro Las Américas (anchors include Liverpool, Sears, Suburbia, Coppel, Cinépolis, Sanborns)
 Multiplaza Aragón, anchors include: Walmart, Sam's Club, Bodega Aurrerá, Suburbia, Coppel, Cinépolis;  gross leasable area

Huixquilucan (area including Interlomas)
 Centro Comercial Interlomas (anchors include Chedraui, Innovasport, Sanborns, Cinépolis)
 Magnocentro (anchors include City Market, Decathlon, Home Depot, Walmart)
 Espacio Interlomas (anchors include SportsWorld, Superama)
 La Piazza  
 Paseo Interlomas, anchors include Liverpool, Palacio de Hierro, Sears;  gross leasable area

Las Aguilas
 Plaza Axomiatla
 Plaza Las Águilas

Lerma
 Las Plazas Outlet

Metepec
 Galerías Metepec
 Plaza las Américas
 Plaza la Pilita
 Plaza Mía
 Pabellón Metepec
 Paseo Metepec
 Town Square Metepec

Naucalpan incl. Ciudad Satélite

 La Cúspide Sky Mall - Lomas Verdes (anchors include Sam's Club, Walmart)
 Mexipuerto Cementos Fortaleza Cuatro Caminos (transit terminal, residential, sports and shopping complex; anchors include Sears, Sanborns, Cinemex)  of commercial gross leasable area
 Mundo E
 Plaza Satélite, anchors include Costco, Liverpool, Palacio de Hierro, Sears, La Parisina, Cinépolis;  gross leasable area
Toreo Parque Central,  gross leasable area

Ciudad Nezahualcóyotl
 Centro Comercial Ciudad Jardín
 Plaza Ciudad Jardín (anchors include Liverpool, Sears, Suburbia, Cinépolis)

Ciudad Nicolás Romero
 Town Center Nicolás Romero (anchors include Suburbia, Sam's Club, Walmart)

Tecamac
Macroplaza Tecámac
Plaza Tecámac/Tecámac Power Center (anchors include Home Depot, Liverpool, Walmart)

Tlalnepantla
Multiplaza Arboledas (anchors include Suburbia
 Multiplaza Valle Dorado
Plaza Tlalne Fashion Mall (anchors include Liverpool, Sears)

Toluca
 Galerías Toluca
 Plaza Lerma 
 Plaza Toluca

Michoacán 
Morelia
 Escala Morelia (Plaza Morelia) (Cinépolis, Chili's, Martí, Nike Factory Store and formerly Soriana Híper Plus)
 Macro Plaza Estadio (Walmart, Coppel, Ilahui and Cinemex)
 Plaza Fiesta Camelinas (Bodega Aurrerá, Coppel, RadioShack)
 Espacio Las Américas (Fashion Mall) (Liverpool, Sears, Sanborns, C&A, Cinépolis, Cinépolis VIP, Game Planet, Pull & Bear, Zara, Zara Home, Bershka and Miniso)
 Paseo Altozano (Fashion Mall) (Liverpool, Sears, Sanborns, Selecto Súper Chedraui, Cinemex, Platino Cinemex, Game Planet, H&M, Forever 21, Mac Store and Flexi)
 Espacio La Huerta (Power Center) (Walmart, Cinépolis, The Home Depot)
 Plaza Punto Outlet

Zamora
 Sentura Zamora (Fashion Mall)  (Liverpool, Suburbia, Cinépolis, Europiel, Beer House, Rebel Wings, Coppel Canadá, Parisina, LOB, LOB Footwear, Shasa, Ilahui, GOC Make Up, STOP, FaSoLa and Urban Store)
 Plaza Ana (Community Center)  (Walmart [before Gigante], Farmacias Guadalajara, Coppel and Cinépolis)
 Plaza Las Palomas (Power Center)  (Soriana Híper [before Comercial Mexicana], Little Caesar's Pizza and Santa Clara)
 Plaza Zamora (Downtown) (Woolworth, Coppel, Elektra, La Marina Navieri and Merza, among others)
 Mercado Soriana (Power Center) (Soriana Mercado)
 Plaza Ventanas (Plaza del Sol) (Power Center) (Farmacias Benavides)
 Paseo Zamora (Power Center)  (Cinemex and Office Depot)

Lázaro Cárdenas
 Plaza Las Américas (Community Center) (Walmart, SAM'S CLUB, Office Depot, Cinépolis, Mc. Donald's, Starbucks, GOC Make Up, Promoda and Coppel Canadá)
 Plaza Soriana Lázaro Cárdenas (Power Center) (Soriana Mercado, Coppel and Cinemex)

La Piedad
 NEA Shopping Center (Fashion Mall) (Walmart, SAM'S CLUB, Promoda, Burger King and Cinemex)
 Plaza Galerías del Río (Power Center) (Soriana Mercado, Cinépolis, Elektra and Famsa)

Uruapan
 Ágora Uruapan (Community Center) (Walmart, SAM'S CLUB, Suburbia, Cinépolis, Toks, Starbucks, Flexi, C&A and Miniso)
 Plaza Galerías Metropolitana Uruapan (Power Center) (Soriana Híper [initially Soriana Mercado], Cinépolis, Elektra, The Home Depot, Little Caesar's Pizza and Promoda)
 Plaza Soriana Uruapan (Power Center) (Soriana Híper and Famsa)

Zitácuaro
 Grand Plaza Los Soles (Fashion Mall) (Suburbia and Cinépolis)

Morelos 
Cuernavaca
 Galerías Cuernavaca
 Plaza Cuernavaca
 Forum Cuernavaca
 Averanda
 Portal D10

Jiutepec
Plaza Cibeles
Plaza Cedros

Cuautla
Plaza Atrios

Nayarit 
Tepic
 Forum Tepic (Fashion & LifeStyle Mall)
 Centro Histórico de Tepic (Downtown)
 Plaza Alica (Community Center)
 Walmart Tepic (Power Center)
 Plaza J&K (Strip Mall)
 Plaza Cigarrera (Power Center)
 Plaza La Loma (Community Center)
 Plaza Galerías del Valle (LifeStyle Center)
 Manglar Shopping Center (Strip Mall)
 Plaza La Cantera (Power Center)
 POP Plaza Gourmet (Gourmet Mall)
 Plaza Ubika (Strip Mall)
 Practiplaza Oriente (Strip Mall)
 Plaza Las Flores Tepic (Strip Mall)

Nuevo Vallarta
 Paradise Mall (Fashion Mall)
 Plaza El Faro (Community Center)
 Centro Comercial Lago Real (Community Center)
 Plaza Soriana Nuevo Vallarta (Power Center)
 LaComer Nuevo Vallarta (Power Center)
 Plaza Chedraui Nuevo Vallarta (Power Center)
 Plaza Chedraui Bucerías (Power Center)
 Plaza Bahía (Strip Mall)
 Plaza Parabién (Strip Mall)
 Practiplaza Oriente (Strip Mall)
 Plaza Las Palmas San Vicente (Strip Mall)
 Mi Bodega Aurrerá San José del Valle (Power Center)
 Ley San José del Valle (Power Center)
 Soriana Express San Vicente Bahía de Banderas (Power Center)

Acaponeta
 Paseo Gardenia (Strip Mall)
 Mi Bodega Aurrerá Acaponeta (Power Center)
 Soriana Acaponeta (Power Center)

Nuevo León 
 Apodaca
 Centro Comercial Sendero Apodaca

Ciudad Juárez
 Sun Mall Juárez

Escobedo
 Centro Comercial Sendero

Guadalupe
 Multiplaza Lindavista
 Sun Mall Guadalupe

Monterrey
 Centro Comercial San Roque
 Centro Comercial Sendero Lincoln 
 Galerías Monterrey
 Interplaza Shoptown
 Multiplaza Lincoln 
 Plaza Adana 
 Plaza Cumbres
 Plaza Fiesta San Agustín
 Plaza Gran Patio 
 Plaza México

San Nicolás de los Garza
 Citadel Monterrey
 Plaza Fiesta Anáhuac

San Pedro Garza García
 Galerías Valle Oriente 
 Mall del Valle
 Paseo San Pedro 
 Plaza San Pedro

Puebla 
Puebla
 Angelópolis Mall
 Centro Comercial Cruz del Sur
 Centro Comercial La Noria
 Centro Comercial Milenium (closed)
 Centro Comercial Plaza Dorada
 Centro Comercial El Triangulo 
 Galeria las Animas
 Galerias Serdan 
 Outlet Puebla Premier 
 Palmas Plaza
 Parque Puebla
 Paseo San Francisco
 Periplaza
 Plaza America
 Plaza Centro Sur
 Plaza Crystal 
 Plaza Las Torres
 Plaza Loreto
 Plaza San Angel
 Plaza San Antonio
 Plaza San Diego
 Plaza San Jose
 Plaza San Pedro
 Plaza Victoria
 Puebla Hermanos Serdan
 Servi Plaza

Tehuacan
 Centro Comercial El Paseo Tehuacan 
 Plaza Tehuacan

Other
 Plaza Crystal - Teziutlan

Querétaro 
Santiago de Querétaro
 Antea 
 Galerías Querétaro 
 Plaza Boulevares 
 Plaza Constituyentes 
 Plaza de las Americas 
 Plaza del Parque 
 Plaza El Puente 
 Plaza Galerías Constituyentes 
 Plaza Korfu 
 Plaza Maravillas Tlacote 
 Plaza Sendero 
 Urban Center Jurica 
 Urban Center Juriquilla

Quintana Roo 
Cancún
 Cancún Mall 
 Centro Comercial la Isla 
 Flamingo Plaza
 Kukulcan Plaza 
 La Gran Plaza Cancún 
 Paseo Cancún 
 Plaza Caracol 
 Las Américas Centro Comercial (anchors include Chedraui, Liverpool, Sears)
 Plaza Mendez

Chetumal
 Plaza Las Américas

Cozumel
 Centro Comercial Punta Langosta  
 Terminal Marítima Puerto Maya

Playa del Carmen
 Centro Maya
 Plaza Las Américas

San Luis Potosí 
San Luis Potosí
 Plaza Citadella 
 Plaza Chapultepec 1200  
 Plaza El Dorado
 Plaza Fiesta 
 Plaza San Luis 
 Plaza Sendero 
 Plaza Tangamanga  
 Soriana El Paseo

Sinaloa 
Culiacán
 Forum Mall

Los Mochis
 Paseo Mochis

Mazatlán

Sonora 
Hermosillo
 Plaza Sendero
 Plaza Sahuaro
 Galerías Mall
 Pabellón Reforma
 Colossus
 Plaza Andenes Hermosillo
 Metrocentro
Ciudad Obregón
 Plaza Tutúli

Tamaulipas 
Altamira
 Plaza Comercial SunMall

Nuevo Laredo
 Paseo Reforma 
 Plaza Soriana Reforma

Matamoros
 Plaza Fiesta
 Plaza Sendero

Reynosa
 Plaza del Rio 
 Plaza Periférico 
 Plaza Real

Tampico
 Plaza Comercial SunMall 
 Plaza Comercial Tres Arcos 
 Plaza Sendero 
 Shopping Tampico

Tlaxcala 
Tlaxcala
 Gran Patio Tlaxcala
 Galerias Tlaxcala
 Soriana - Plaza Inn 
 Soriana - Plaza Tlaxcala

Veracruz 

Boca del Río
 Plaza Américas
 Plaza Mocambo
 Plaza El Dorado
 Plaza Andamar

Coatepec
 Plaza Crystal

Coatzacoalcos
 Forum Coatzacoalcos
 Paseo del Mar 
 Patio Coatzacoalcos  
 Plaza Cristal  
 Plaza El Palmar 
 Plaza Las Palmas 
 Puerto Esmeralda

Córdoba
 Plaza Cristal

Orizaba
 Plaza O

Poza Rica
 Forum Poza Rica  (cancelado)
 Gran Patio Poza Rica 
 Plaza Crystal Poza Rica 
 Plaza Soriana Poza Rica

Veracruz
 Plaza Crystal 
 Plaza Palmas
 Plaza del Puerto

Xalapa
 Plaza Américas 
 Plaza Crystal 
 Plaza Las Animas 
 Plaza Museo

Yucatán 
Mérida
 City Center Caucel -   power center
 City Center Mérida -   neighborhood shopping center
 Galerías Mérida -   fashion mall
 Interplaza Las Palmas -  power center
 Macroplaza Mérida -  power center
 Plaza Altabrisa - fashion mall
 Plaza Buenavista -  power center
 Plaza Canek -   power center
 Plaza Crystal -   power center
 Plaza Dorada -   power center
 Plaza Fiesta -  power center
 Plaza Las Américas -  power center
 Plaza Oriente -  power center
 Sendero Mérida -  power center

Motul
 Plaza Oasis

Progreso
 Plaza del Mar -  power center
 Plaza Mirvana - Ticul

Valladolid
 Plaza Bella - power center

External links

References

 
Mexico
Shopping malls